Avernold Qyrani (born 20 April 1998) is an Albanian professional footballer who plays as a goalkeeper for Albanian club KF Korabi Peshkopi.

Career statistics

Club

References

External links
 Profile FSHF.org
 

1998 births
Living people
People from Gjirokastër County
People from Gjirokastër
Association football goalkeepers
Albanian footballers
Luftëtari Gjirokastër players
KF Naftëtari Kuçovë players
KF Korabi Peshkopi players
Kategoria Superiore players
Kategoria e Parë players